The Costa Rican Lutheran Church (Iglesia Luterana Costarricense) is a Lutheran denomination in Costa Rica. It is a member of the Lutheran World Federation, which it joined in 2002. It is also a member of the Communion of Lutheran Churches in Central America and the Ecumenical Council of Churches of Costa Rica.

External links 
Official website
Lutheran World Federation listing

Lutheran denominations
Lutheranism in South America
Lutheran World Federation members
Members of the World Council of Churches